Dill (Anethum graveolens) is an annual herb in the celery family Apiaceae. It is native to North Africa, Chad, Iran, and the Arabian Peninsula; it is grown widely in Eurasia, where its leaves and seeds are used as a herb or spice for flavouring food.

Etymology 
The word dill and its close relatives are found in most of the Germanic languages; its ultimate origin is unknown.

Taxonomy 
The generic name Anethum is the Latin form of Greek ἄνῑσον / ἄνησον / ἄνηθον / ἄνητον, which meant both 'dill' and 'anise'.  The form anīsum came to be used for anise, and anēthum for dill. The Latin word is the origin of dill's names in the Western Romance languages (anet, aneldo, etc.), and also of the obsolete English anet.

Botany 

In hot or dry weather, small white to yellow scented flowers form in small umbels  diameter from one long stalk.

History 
Dill has been found in the tomb of Egyptian Pharaoh Amenhotep II, dating to around 1400 BC. It was also later found in the Greek city of Samos, around the 7th century BC, and mentioned in the writings of Theophrastus (371–287 BC).

Culinary use 

Fresh and dried dill leaves (sometimes called "dill weed" or "dillweed" to distinguish it from dill seed) are widely used as herbs in Europe and central Asia.

Like caraway, the fern-like leaves of dill are aromatic and are used to flavour many foods such as gravlax (cured salmon) and other fish dishes, borscht, and other soups, as well as pickles (where the dill flower is sometimes used). Dill is best when used fresh, as it loses its flavor rapidly if dried. However, freeze-dried dill leaves retain their flavour relatively well for a few months.

Dill oil is extracted from the leaves, stems, and seeds of the plant. The oil from the seeds is distilled and used in the manufacturing of soaps.

Dill is the eponymous ingredient in dill pickles.

European cuisine
In central and eastern Europe, Scandinavia, the Baltic states, Ukraine, and Russia, dill is a staple culinary herb along with chives and parsley. Fresh, finely cut dill leaves are used as a topping in soups, especially the hot red borsht and the cold borsht mixed with curds, kefir, yogurt, or sour cream, which is served during hot summer weather and is called okroshka. It also is popular in summer to drink fermented milk (curds, kefir, yogurt, or buttermilk) mixed with dill (and sometimes other herbs).

In the same way, dill is used as a topping for boiled potatoes covered with fresh butter – especially in summer when there are so-called "new", or young, potatoes. The dill leaves may be mixed with butter, making a dill butter, to serve the same purpose. Dill leaves mixed with tvorog form one of the traditional cheese spreads used for sandwiches. Fresh dill leaves are used throughout the year as an ingredient in salads, e.g., one made of lettuce, fresh cucumbers, and tomatoes, as basil leaves are used in Italy and Greece.

Its supposed antiflatulent activity caused some Russian cosmonauts to recommend its use in human spaceflight due to the confined quarters and closed air supply.

In Polish cuisine, fresh dill leaves mixed with sour cream are the basis for dressings. It is especially popular to use this kind of sauce with freshly cut cucumbers, which are almost wholly immersed in the sauce, making a salad called mizeria. Dill sauce is used hot for baked freshwater fish and for chicken or turkey breast, or used hot or cold for hard-boiled eggs. A dill-based soup, (zupa koperkowa), served with potatoes and hard-boiled eggs, is popular in Poland. Whole stems including roots and flower buds are used traditionally to prepare Polish-style pickled cucumbers (ogórki kiszone), especially the so-called low-salt cucumbers (ogórki małosolne). Whole stems of dill (often including the roots) also are cooked with potatoes, especially the potatoes of autumn and winter, so they resemble the flavour of the newer potatoes found in summer. Some kinds of fish, especially trout and salmon, traditionally are baked with the stems and leaves of dill.

In the Czech Republic, white dill sauce made of cream (or milk), butter, flour, vinegar, and dill is called koprová omáčka (also koprovka or kopračka) and is served either with boiled eggs and potatoes, or with dumplings and boiled beef. Another Czech dish with dill is a soup called kulajda that contains mushrooms (traditionally wild ones).

In Germany, dill is popular as a seasoning for fish and many other dishes, chopped as a garnish on potatoes, and as a flavouring in pickles.

In the UK, dill may be used in fish pie.

In Bulgaria dill is widely used in traditional vegetable salads, and most notably the yogurt-based cold soup Tarator. It is also used in the preparation of sour pickles, cabbage, and other dishes.

In Romania dill (mărar) is widely used as an ingredient for soups such as borş (pronounced "borsh"), pickles, and other dishes, especially those based on peas, beans, and cabbage. It is popular for dishes based on potatoes and mushrooms and may be found in many summer salads (especially cucumber salad, cabbage salad and lettuce salad). During springtime, it is used in omelets with spring onions. It often complements sauces based on sour cream or yogurt and is mixed with salted cheese and used as a filling. Another popular dish with dill as a main ingredient is dill sauce, which is served with eggs and fried sausages.

In Hungary, dill is very widely used. It is popular as a sauce or filling, and mixed with a type of cottage cheese. Dill is also used for pickling and in salads. The Hungarian name for dill is kapor.

In Serbia, dill is known as mirodjija and is used as an addition to soups, potato and cucumber salads, and French fries. It features in the Serbian proverb, "бити мирођија у свакој чорби" /biti mirodjija u svakoj čorbi/ (to be a dill in every soup), which corresponds to the English proverb "to have a finger in every pie".

In Greece, dill is known as άνηθος (anithos). In antiquity it was used as an ingredient in wines that were called "anithites oinos" (wine with anithos-dill). In modern days, dill is used in salads, soups, sauces, and fish and vegetable dishes.

In Santa Maria, Azores, dill (endro) is the most important ingredient of the traditional Holy Ghost soup (sopa do Espírito Santo). Dill is found ubiquitously in Santa Maria, yet, is rare in the other Azorean Islands.

In Sweden, dill is a common spice or herb. The top of fully grown dill is called krondill (crown dill); this is used when cooking crayfish. The krondill is put into the water after the crayfish is boiled, but still in hot and salt water. Then the entire dish is refrigerated for at least 24 hours before being served (with toasted bread and butter). Krondill also is used for pickles, vodka, not wine, sugar, and krondill. After a month or two of fermentation, the cucumber pickles are ready to eat, for instance, with pork, brown sauce, and potatoes, as a "sweetener". The thinner part of dill and young plants may be used with boiled fresh potatoes (especially the first potatoes of the year, "new potatoes", which usually are small and have a very thin skin). In salads it is used together with, or instead, of other green herbs, such as parsley, chives, and basil. It often is paired up with chives when used in food. Dill often is used to flavour fish and seafood in Sweden, for example, gravlax and various herring pickles, among them the traditional, sill i dill (literally "herring in dill"). In contrast to the various fish dishes flavoured with dill, there is also a traditional Swedish dish called, dillkött, which is a meaty stew flavoured with dill. The dish commonly contains pieces of veal or lamb that are boiled until tender and then served together with a vinegary dill sauce. Dill seeds may be used in breads or akvavit. A newer, non-traditional use of dill is to pair it with chives as a flavouring for potato chips. These are called "dillchips" and are quite popular in Sweden.

Asian and Middle Eastern cooking

In Iran, dill is known as shevid and sometimes, is used with rice and called shevid-polo. It also is used in Iranian aash recipes, and similarly, is called  in Persian.

In Telugu, it is called Soa-kura (herb greens). It also is called  (ಸಬ್ಬಸಿಗೆ ಸೊಪ್ಪು) in Kannada. In Sanskrit, this herb is called . In India, dill is prepared in the manner of yellow moong dal, as a main-course dish. It is considered to have very good antiflatulent properties, so it is used as mukhwas, or an after-meal digestive. Traditionally, it is given to mothers immediately after childbirth. In the state of Uttar Pradesh in India, a small amount of fresh dill is cooked along with cut potatoes and fresh fenugreek leaves (Hindi आलू-मेथी-सोया).

In Laos and parts of northern Thailand, dill is known in English as Lao coriander ( or ), and served as a side with salad yum or papaya salad. In the Lao language, it is called phak see, and in Thai, it is known as phak chee Lao. In Lao cuisine, Lao coriander is used extensively in traditional Lao dishes such as mok pa (steamed fish in banana leaf) and several coconut milk curries that contain fish or prawns.

In China dill is called colloquially, huíxiāng (perfume of Hui people), or more properly shíluó. It is a common filling in baozi, jiaozi and xianbing and may be used as vegetarian with rice vermicelli, or combined with either meat or eggs. Vegetarian dill baozi are a common part of a Beijing breakfast. In baozi and xianbing, it often is interchangeable with non-bulbing fennel and the term  also may refer to fennel, similarly to caraway and coriander leaf, sharing a name in Chinese as well. Dill also may be stir fried as a potherb, often with egg, in the same manner as Chinese chives. In Northern China, Beijing, Inner-Mongolia, Ningxia, Gansu, and Xinjiang, dill seeds commonly are called zīrán, but also kūmíng, kūmíngzi, shíluózi, xiǎohuíxiāngzi and are used with pepper for lamb meat. In the whole of China, yángchuàn or yángròu chuàn, lamb brochette, a speciality from Uyghurs, uses cumin and pepper. 

In Taiwan, it is also commonly used as a filling in steamed buns (baozi) and dumplings (jiaozi).

In Vietnam, the use of dill in cooking is regional. It is used mainly in northern Vietnamese cuisine.

Middle Eastern uses 
In Arab countries, dill seed, called  (grasshopper's eye), is used as a spice in cold dishes such as fattoush and pickles. In Arab countries of the Persian Gulf, dill is called shibint and is used mostly in fish dishes. In Egypt, dillweed is commonly used to flavour cabbage dishes, including mahshi koronb (stuffed cabbage leaves).
In Israel, dill weed is used in salads and also to flavour omelettes, often alongside parsley.

Use in medicine 
Indians have traditionally consumed dill seeds to treat their gastrointestinal problems like indigestion and flatulence, it also has mildly diuretic properties.

Cultivation 
Successful cultivation requires warm to hot summers with high sunshine levels; even partial shade will reduce the yield substantially. It also prefers rich, well-drained soil. The seeds are viable for three to ten years. The plants are somewhat monocarpic and quickly die after "bolting" (producing seeds). High temperatures may quicken bolting.

The seed is harvested by cutting the flower heads off the stalks when the seed is beginning to ripen. The seed heads are placed upside down in a paper bag and left in a warm, dry place for a week. The seeds then separate from the stems easily for storage in an airtight container.

These plants, like their fennel and parsley relatives, often are eaten by black swallowtail caterpillars in areas where that species occurs. For this reason, they may be included in some butterfly gardens.

Companion planting 

When used as a companion plant, dill attracts many beneficial insects as the umbrella flower heads go to seed. It makes a good companion plant for cucumbers and broccoli. The herb grows well with corn, cabbage, lettuce, and onions; but it can limit the growth of carrots.

Tomatoes will benefit from dill when they are young since it will repel harmful pests while attracting pollinators, but as dill matures and flowers it will slow or stop the growth of tomatoes. Prune dill regularly so it does not flower if planted next to tomatoes.

Aroma profile 
 Apiole and dillapiole
 Carvone
Limonene
 Myristicin
 Umbelliferone

Medicinal qualities
 Antibacterial activity against Staphylococcus aureus
 Antimicrobial activity against Saccharomyces cerevisiae

See also 
 List of Indian spices

References

External links

 Plants for a Future: Anethum graveolens
 'A Modern Herbal' (Grieves, 1931)
 Jepson Manual Treatment

Arab cuisine
Edible Apiaceae
Flora of Asia
Flora of Europe
Herbs
Iranian cuisine
Iraqi cuisine
Medicinal plants
Monoamine oxidase inhibitors
Plants described in 1753
Plants used in Ayurveda
Spices
Apioideae